The Great Guildo (subtitled Soulful Piano) is a double album by jazz pianist Gildo Mahones recorded for the Prestige label in 1963 and 1964 and released in 1965. The album included five tracks intended for the pianist's debut album that were shelved temporarily when the Prestige subsidiary label New Jazz ceased releases.

Reception

AllMusic awarded the album 4½ stars stating simply "Two-fer. Excellent jazz. A must-buy".

Track listing
All compositions by Gildo Mahones, except where noted.
 "Blues for Yna Yna"- 5:00
 "Blue" – 5:15
 "I Should Care" (Sammy Cahn, Axel Stordahl, Paul Weston) – 5:50
 "I Wish You Love" (Léo Chauliac, Charles Trenet) – 5:30
 "I Wonder What's Become of Our Love" – 5:30
 "Alone Together" (Howard Dietz, Arthur Schwartz) – 6:45
 "Walkin'" (Richard Carpenter) – 5:40
 "Something Missing" – 3:30
 "The Sweetest Sounds" (Richard Rodgers) – 4:45
 "Rainy Day Love" – 4:20
 "Mambesi"- 3:55
 "Water Blues Fall" – 6:45
 "Oye Ami Piano" – 4:00
 "Good Morning Heartache" (Irene Higginbotham, Ervin Drake, Dan Fisher) – 5:45
 "Bali Ha'i" (Oscar Hammerstein II, Richard Rodgers) – 4:20
 "Tales of Brooklyn" – 3:55
Recorded at Van Gelder Studio in Englewood Cliffs, New Jersey on February 4, 1963 (track 15), August 15, 1963 (track 16), September 3, 1963 (tracks 9, 12 & 14) and June 4, 1964 (tracks 1-8, 10, 11 & 13)

Personnel
Gildo Mahones – piano
Leo Wright – alto saxophone (track 16)
Kenny Burrell – guitar (track 16)
Larry Young – organ (track 15)
George Tucker – bass
Sonny Brown (tracks 1-8, 10, 11 & 13), Jimmie Smith (tracks 9, 12 & 14-16) – drums
 Ozzie Cadena – producer
 Rudy Van Gelder – engineer

References

Gildo Mahones albums
1964 albums
Prestige Records albums
Albums produced by Ozzie Cadena
Albums recorded at Van Gelder Studio